Rovers FC (formerly known as Rovers United) is a soccer club based in the U.S. Virgin Islands. The team competes in the St. Croix Soccer League.

Honors 
 St. Croix Soccer League:
 Winners (1): 2012–13
 Runners-up (5): 2001–02, 2003–04, 2004–05, 2011–12, 2014–15

References 

Soccer clubs in the United States Virgin Islands